18 Pashons - Coptic calendar - 20 Pashons

Fixed commemorations
All fixed commemorations below are observed on 19 Pashons (27 May) by the Coptic Orthodox Church.

Saints
Saint Isaac, the Priest of Scetes
Saint Isidore of Antioch

References
Coptic Synexarion

Days of the Coptic calendar